Algoma was an electoral riding in Ontario, Canada. It was created in 1867 at the time of confederation. In 1885 it was split into two: Algoma East and Algoma West. In 1902 it was re-established as a single riding and was abolished in 1933 before the 1934 election. In 1967 it was re-established a second time and lasted until 1999 when it was merged into Algoma—Manitoulin.

Members of Provincial Parliament

Algoma (1867-1885)

Algoma East

Algoma West

Algoma (1902-1934)

Algoma (1967-1999)

References

Notes

Citations

Former provincial electoral districts of Ontario
1996 disestablishments in Ontario